Sherwood Leslie Gorbach (born 1934) is an Emeritus Professor at Tufts University School of Medicine. He was editor-in-chief of the journal Clinical Infectious Diseases from 2000 to 2016.

Education
He graduated from Brandeis University in 1955, and completed his MD at Tufts University School of Medicine in 1962.

Lactobacillus rhamnosus GG
Lactobacillus rhamnosus GG (ATCC 53103) is a strain of Lactobacillus rhamnosus that was isolated in 1983 from the intestinal tract of a healthy human by Gorbach and Barry Goldin; the 'GG' derives from the first letters of their surnames.

Awards
He was awarded the Alexander Fleming Award for Lifetime Achievement from the Infectious Diseases Society of America in 2007.

Selected publications

Articles

Books

References



1934 births
Living people
Brandeis University alumni
Tufts University School of Medicine alumni
Tufts University School of Medicine faculty